Gando may refer to

Places
 Gando, Benin, a village in Donga Department
 Gando, Burkina Faso, Boulgou Province
 Gando I, Boulgou Province, Burkina Faso
 Gando II, Boulgou Province, Burkina Faso
 Gando Constituency, a parliamentary constituency on the island of Pemba, Tanzania
 Gando, Zanzibar, a village in Tanzania
 Gandō Dam, Iwate Prefecture, Japan
 Gando, the Korean name for Jiandao
 Gran Canaria Airport, Gran Canaria, Spain, formerly known as Gando Airport
 Gwandu or Gando, Nigeria
Gando (TV series) a Serial made in Iran

Other uses
 Mugger crocodile, a short-muzzled crocodile of southern Asia, known locally by the name gando
 Orlando Gando (born 1992), São Toméan footballer

See also
 Kando (disambiguation)